Gyroptychius is an extinct genus of osteolepiform lobe-finned fish from the Devonian period.

As its eyes were relatively small, it is presumed to have hunted by smell rather than sight. Gyroptychius had short jaws which gave it a powerful bite. All its fins except the pectorals were moved to the back to the body, increasing the power of the tail while swimming.

References

Prehistoric lobe-finned fish genera
Megalichthyiforms
Devonian bony fish
Devonian fish of Europe